Lucy Rose Hutchinson (born 18 July 2003) is an English former child actress, best known for playing young Elizabeth Shaw in Ridley Scott's Prometheus.

Biography
Hutchinson's first acting experience came in the 2008 film Dustbin Baby, based on Jacqueline Wilson's 2001 novel of the same name. In Dustbin Baby, she played the younger version of the lead character April, seen in flashbacks. Hutchinson was five at the time of filming, and was described by director Juliet May as "one of the most remarkable five year olds I have ever met", saying that "it's like she's not acting at all". Prior to her appearance in Dustbin Baby, Hutchinson had attended a local drama group for children, and was signed up with an agency. Her father said that she got the role because "she was the right face in the right place ... She was incredibly lucky but that doesn't deter from how well she did in getting it."

After the release of Dustbin Baby, Hutchinson played roles in British television programmes EastEnders, Doc Martin and Psychoville. Her film debut came when she filmed scenes for the American film Prometheus, in which she played a younger version of the main character, Elizabeth Shaw.  Hutchinson said "It was really good and I think the experience was great for me as well. It was filming at Pinewood, it is such a big place and that showed me what other sets were being built there which was good. I have never really been to a big set before, I just thought 'wow'. I know it was a big scene, Ridley Scott told me it was a really big scene. I was quite confident and just thought 'yeah I am going to do this'."

Hutchinson subsequently made appearances on radio, stage and television, including roles in Little Crackers, The Politician's Husband, Not Going Out and Inside No. 9. She has main roles Dani's Castle and the BBC comedy The Kennedys.

, then-eight-year-old Hutchinson attended school in Croydon, where she lived  with her parents, Gary and Anna, and older brother.

Filmography

Film and television

Stage

Radio

References

External links
 
 Advert for "Goodfella's Pizza Fairy Everyday" featuring Lucy Hutchinson
 Advert for "Amazon Kindle Kids TV Commercial UK" with Lucy Hutchinson

2003 births
English child actresses
Living people
People from Croydon
21st-century English actresses
English television actresses
English film actresses
People from Lewisham
Actresses from London